Irvin Woodberry "Chester" Brooks (June 5, 1891 – February 4, 1966) was an American baseball player in the Negro leagues.    Several reference books incorrectly list him as "Chester" Brooks born in the Bahamas, he was actually born in Key West, Florida and during his playing career he was known as "Irvin" (or occasionally as "Irving"). The nickname "Chester" and reference to West Indian origins apparently first appears in print in articles by Cumberland Posey.  From 1918 to 1933 he played pitcher, infielder, and outfielder.

Brooks spent his entire playing career with the Brooklyn Royal Giants and was an outstanding hitter.  Cumberland Posey, the influential owner of the Homestead Grays, named Brooks to his all-time Negro league baseball all-star team.

References

External links
 and Baseball-Reference Black Baseball stats and Seamheads
 

1891 births
1966 deaths
People from Key West, Florida
Baseball players from Florida
Brooklyn Royal Giants players
Place of death missing
20th-century African-American sportspeople
Baseball infielders
Baseball pitchers
Burials at Long Island National Cemetery